The Shining Stars are a pop rock'n'roll group from London, England fronted by singer, songwriter and multi-instrumentalist David McCarthy.

A style firmly based in the classic British tradition of guitar-based, highly structured songs in the lineage of The Beatles, Badfinger, Teenage Fanclub, Stone Roses and Oasis led to Q describing the sound as "imagine if Noel Gallagher made a record with Damon Albarn."

In 2011 a demo of the song 'The Hi Life' received airplay support from the XFM UK radio network and was called "brilliantly catchy" by DJ Mag which noted the Stone Roses references in the track.

Debut single "The Stars Fall From The Sky" was released in October 2013 and The Sunday Times said it was the work of "a classic British songwriter on a line that stretches from John Martyn to Paul Weller."

References

External links 
 www.corsair-represents.com
 www.theshiningstars.co.uk

English rock music groups
Musical groups from London